The 1965 All-Southwest Conference football team consists of American football players chosen by various organizations for All-Southwest Conference teams for the 1965 NCAA University Division football season.  The selectors for the 1965 season included the Associated Press (AP).

All Southwest selections

Offense

Backs
 Donny Anderson, Texas Tech (AP-1)
 Bobby Burnett, Arkansas (AP-1)
 Tom Wilson, Texas Tech (AP-1)
 Harry Jones, Arkansas (AP-1)
 Jon Brittenum, Arkansas (AP-1)

Ends
 Bobby Crockett, Arkansas (AP-1)
 Pete Lammons, Texas (AP-1)

Tackles
 Glen Ray Hines, Arkansas (AP-1)
 Jim Vining, Rice (AP-1)

Guards
 Lynn Thornhill, SMU (AP-1)
 Frank Bedrick, Texas (AP-1)

Centers
 Jack Howe, Texas (AP-1)

Defense

Defensive ends
 Doug January, SMU (AP-1)
 Jack Brasuell, Arkansas (AP-1)
 Bobby Roper, Arkansas (AP-1 [P])

Defensive tackles
 Loyd Phillips, Arkansas (AP-1)
 Jim Williams, Arkansas (AP-1)

Linebackers
 Tommy Nobis, Texas (AP-1)
 John LaGrone, SMU (AP-1)
 Diron Talbert, Texas (AP-1)

Defensive backs
 Frank Horak, TCU (AP-1)
 Ronnie Reel, SMU (AP-1)
 Tommy Trantham, Arkansas (AP-1)

Key
AP = Associated Press

See also
1965 College Football All-America Team

References

All-Southwest Conference
All-Southwest Conference football teams